The Ireland cricket team is the cricket team representing all of Ireland. Since 2017 they have been a Full Member of the International Cricket Council. Although Cricket in Ireland has had a presence since the early 1800s, it was in 1993 the Irish Cricket Union, the predecessor to Cricket Ireland, was elected to the International Cricket Council (ICC) as an Associate member. In the 1997 ICC Trophy, Ireland narrowly missed out on qualifying for the 1999 Cricket World Cup, which was ironically co hosted by Ireland, Scotland, England and the Netherlands. Ireland qualified for the World Cup for the first time in 2007, and has since played in the 2011 and 2015 tournaments, and the 2010, 2012, and 2014 World Twenty20 competitions. Ireland's best performance was in 2007, where they surprisingly qualified for the Super 8 Stages.

Cricket World Cup Record

White: Group/Round-Robin Stage

World Cup Record (By Team)

2007 World Cup

Ireland's performance in their inaugural World Cup in the 2007 tournament took many pundits by surprise. Their first game was on 15 March when they tied with Zimbabwe, primarily thanks to Ireland's first ever World Cup century by man-of-the-match Jeremy Bray and economical bowling in the final overs by Trent Johnston and Andre Botha. In their second match, played on Saint Patrick's Day, they beat the fourth-ranked team in the world, Pakistan, by three wickets, thus knocking Pakistan out of the competition. These two results were sufficient to advance Ireland to the Super 8 stage of the tournament. Their final group stage game was against the West Indies, where they lost by eight wickets. In the Super 8 stage, they lost their four matches against England, South Africa, New Zealand, Australia, and Sri Lanka, but recorded a 74-run victory against the 9th ranked team in the world and Test playing nation Bangladesh. The team received a heroes welcome in Dublin.

Group stage

Ireland had a much better first outing than fellow World Cup debutants Bermuda, managing a tie against the Test nation of Zimbabwe after Jeremy Bray scored his second One Day International century in the space of six weeks. Bray put on 43 with Eoin Morgan for the second wicket, but two wickets from Elton Chigumbura set them back to 64 for four after 15 overs.

Bray remained in, however, carrying his bat to 115 not out and sharing partnerships of 54 with Andrew White, 37 with captain Trent Johnston and 39 with Dave Langford-Smith. Zimbabwe used spinners Prosper Utseya, Sean Williams and Stuart Matsikenyeri at the end, who conceded few runs, ending with combined figures of 56 runs from 17 overs. Chigumbura, who had taken the top order wickets, was not reintroduced at the death.

In reply, Zimbabwe made their way to 20 overs with the loss of one wicket, slightly ahead of Ireland's total. However, Johnston broke through when he had Chamu Chibhabha caught, while Vusi Sibanda crept back on the stumps, dismantling a bail to be out hit wicket for 67 as he took off to make a single, not realising his misfortune. Another misfortune struck when Brendan Taylor was run out, essentially by the batsmen on strike (Matsikenyeri) who returned McCallan's ball with a fierce straight drive, taking Taylor's wicket down in the process.

Nevertheless, after Stuart Matsikenyeri's half-century, they required 15 runs with 36 balls remaining; however, they only got six of those runs off the next 30 balls, with Gary Brent and Chris Mpofu rarely managing to get off the strike. Kevin O'Brien, whose only over had cost eight runs, was brought back in the 49th, and he took one wicket and had Mpofu run out in a maiden over. Zimbabwe now needed nine off the last over with only a wicket in hand. Matsikenyeri hit two twos and a single, Ed Rainsford got off the strike with a single off his only ball, before Matsikenyeri tied the scores with a cut for two. With one ball, one wicket and one run in contention, Rainsford's desperate dash caused him to be run out and the match a tie - the third of World Cup history.

Pakistan, ranked fourth in the ICC ODI Championship tables before the tournament, were eliminated from the tournament after five days, an event described by BBC in an online report as "unthinkable". Niall O'Brien made 72, but was out stumped with 25 runs still to get and had to watch as his brother Kevin O'Brien and Trent Johnston put on 20 for the eighth wicket to win the game.

Pakistan were put in to bat, and were bowled out for 132, with extras being the top scorer as Ireland offered 23 wides. Pakistan's captain Inzamam-ul-Haq still credited Ireland's bowlers with bowling "tight lines", while taking the blame for "too many poor shots", as all ten batsmen were out caught. Boyd Rankin took the most wickets, including Younis Khan and top-scorer Kamran Akmal, while Andre Botha's spell of five runs from eight overs also yielded the wickets of Inzamam and opener Imran Nazir.

When Ireland batted, Bray, who had made a hundred in the previous match, fell lbw to Mohammad Sami, who took three for 29 after being left out of the side four days earlier. Ireland fell to 15 for two, but O'Brien and William Porterfield added 37 before Porterfield played a ball from Mohammad Hafeez onto his stumps and was bowled. O'Brien made shots off Hafeez, however, who ended with 15 runs off four overs, one of the three most expensive bowlers of the game. He was eventually stumped for 72, before Iftikhar Anjum struck twice in two balls, Ireland now needing 20 with three wickets in hand. Kevin O'Brien and Trent Johnston got there, however, with Ireland captain Johnston winning the game with a six, the second of the game.

Following the defeat and early exit from the World Cup, there was a huge negative reaction from the millions of passionate Pakistani fans and government, calling for the captain, coach and the president of the board to resign.

Super 8 Stage

England won the toss and batted first, but lost both openers to Boyd Rankin in six overs, before Ian Bell spent 74 balls making his 31. When Bell got out, the run rate was slightly above 4; in the final 28 overs it was in excess of 6, with Paul Collingwood making 90, Kevin Pietersen 48 and Andrew Flintoff 43. Kyle McCallan was the most economical bowler for Ireland, and also took the wicket of Pietersen.

Chasing 267 in reply, Niall O'Brien's third One-day International fifty and his second of the World Cup helped Ireland to a total of 139 for six in the 37th over, but despite faster than a run a ball scores from Trent Johnston and Andrew White Ireland fell 48 runs short as Andrew Flintoff took the final two wickets, though they exceeded their previous World Cup record total by seven runs.

2011 World Cup

The 2011 World Cup was held between February and March and hosted by Bangladesh, India and Sri Lanka. Though Ireland did not progress beyond the first round they secured a historic victory against England. Ireland beat England by 3 wickets with Kevin O'Brien hitting the fastest century in World Cup history, managing the feat in just 50 balls. In passing England's total of 327 for victory, Ireland broke the record for the highest successful run chase in the World Cup.

Bangladesh captain Shakib Al Hasan won the toss against Ireland and elected to bat, after conceding 370 against India after setting them in. His decision seemed to be vindicated at the start of Bangladesh's innings, with Tamim Iqbal unleashing a flurry of boundaries immediately, to take Bangladesh to 49/0 after 5 overs. Ireland needed a moment of inspiration and they got it from wicketkeeper Niall O'Brien who did a brilliant stumping to send Imrul Kayes on his way. Ireland quickly built on it, with a direct hit from Ed Joyce catching Junaid Siddiqui short, before both Tamim and Shakib were also dismissed softly. Mushfiqur Rahim and Raqibul Hasan staged a recovery then, and at 147/4 in the 34th over, Bangladesh looked well set for a score above 250 until Mushfiqur top-edged a sweep of George Dockrell. This triggered another collapse, and only a late cameo from Naeem Islam took Bangladesh to 205.

Ireland started off solidly in their reply, but then the Bangladesh spinners led by Shakib and Mohammad Ashraful took wickets at regular intervals. The match was evenly poised with Ireland 93/4 after 25 overs. Niall O'Brien was the key to the chase but with the score at 110, he was dismissed after a brilliant catch by Tamim Iqbal. Kevin O'Brien continued to fight, taking Ireland above 150 and giving them another sniff at victory till he holed out to deep square-leg off Shafiul Islam. A pumped-up Shafiul then ran through the tail, and Ireland were all out for 178, falling 27 runs short.

Shafiul Islam recorded the best figures for a Bangladeshi bowler in World Cup matches, with 4/21.

England batted first with Jonathan Trott top-scoring, with 92 from 92 balls. During his innings, Trott reached 1,000 runs in ODI cricket, from just 21 innings, equalling the record set by Vivian Richards and team-mate Kevin Pietersen. England batsmen Kevin Pietersen and Ian Bell also hit half-centuries, with Trott and Bell sharing a 177 run partnership. England finished on 327/8 from their 50 overs, having only scored 33 runs from their last 5 overs. 
In reply, Ireland lost their captain, William Porterfield in the very first ball, and were struggling at 111/5 after 25 overs. Kevin O'Brien came in with the score at 106/4, and made 100 in just 50 balls, the fastest century in World Cup history. Ireland scored 62 runs in their batting powerplay, and by the time that Kevin O'Brien was run out for 113 from 63 balls, Ireland required only 11 from 11 balls. Ireland won the match by 3 wickets, with five balls to spare; it was the largest successful run chase in Cricket World Cup history.

2015 World Cup

Ireland qualified for the 2015 Cricket World Cup, and were promoted to the ICC ODI Championship, leaving the World Cricket League, but not the ICC Intercontinental Cup. In their first match of the World Cup, Ireland defeated the West Indies by 4 wickets, chasing down 304 runs with 25 balls to spare. In their second match they beat the United Arab Emirates by two wicket with four balls to spare; the target was 279.   Out of only five successful World Cup chases of 300 runs or more, Ireland have provided three of them.

The West Indies were put into bat by Ireland, who reduced them to 31/2 and 87/5 before Lendl Simmons and Darren Sammy shared a 154 run partnership. They finished their 50 overs with a score of 304/7. In reply, Ireland made 71 runs before losing their first wicket. Paul Stirling and Ed Joyce made a partnership of 106, before Stirling was dismissed. Niall O'Brien finished 79* from 60 balls, to get Ireland over the line with more than four overs remaining. This was Ireland's fourth World Cup victory over a Test playing side and their third successful chase of 300 or more runs in a World Cup.

See also
Ireland national cricket team
Cricket in Ireland

References

World Cup
History of the Cricket World Cup